National Defence Academy or National Defense Academy may refer to:

 National Defence Academy (India), the Joint Services academy of the Indian Armed Forces
 National Defense Academy of Japan, university-level military academy of the Japan Self-Defense Forces
 National Defence Academy of Latvia, an institution of higher education and scientific research in Riga, Latvia
 Academy of National Defence, Poland
 National Defense Academy (Georgia)

See also
 NDA (disambiguation)
 National defense (disambiguation)